Joseph Ngô Quang Kiệt (born 4 September 1952 in Lạng Sơn Province, Vietnam) is the Archbishop Emeritus of Hanoi where he served as archbishop from 2005 to 2010. In 1993, he studied at the Institut Catholique de Paris, France. Before becoming archbishop, he served as apostolic administrator of Hanoi.

In early 2010, at the age of 57, Ngô submitted his resignation to Pope Benedict XVI. In 2008, the mayor of Hanoi had asked that for Ngô's removal from office.
  
On 22 April 2010, 72-year-old Pierre Nguyễn Văn Nhơn, Bishop of Đà Lạt, was appointed Coadjutor Archbishop of Hanoi by Pope Benedict XVI. Pope Benedict accepted Archbishop Ngô Quang Kiệt's resignation on 13 May 2010.

Archbishop Nguyên Van Nhon succeeded to the see on 13 May 2010.

References

1952 births
Living people
People from Lạng Sơn Province
21st-century Roman Catholic archbishops in Vietnam
Vietnamese Roman Catholic archbishops